Target (Hangul: 타겟) is a South Korean boy band formed by JSL Company in Seoul, South Korea. The group consists of six members. They group debuted on January 24, 2018 with Alive.

Members

Current Members 
G.I (지아이)
Zeth (제스)
Hyun (현)
Roi (로이)
Boun (바운)
Woojin (우진)

Former Members
Seulchan (슬찬)

Discography

Extended plays

Single albums

Music Videos
 Please Love me (2014)
 Atsui Omoi (2017)
 Awake (2018)
 It Is True (2018)
 Beautiful (2019)
 Baby Come Back Home (2019)

References

K-pop music groups
South Korean boy bands
South Korean dance music groups
Musical groups from Seoul
Musical groups established in 2018
2018 establishments in South Korea
South Korean pop music groups